"Thinking About Your Love" is a 1985 song by Skipworth & Turner. In the US, it reached number one on the dance chart and number ten on the R&B chart. In the UK, the song reached No. 24 on the singles chart.

References

1985 singles
1985 songs
Song articles with missing songwriters